Jessica Gillarduzzi (born 7 June 1980) is an Italian bobsledder who has competed since 2001. Her best finish in the Bobsleigh World Cup was fifth in the two-woman event in 2007 twice (Cortina d'Ampezzo, Igls).

Gillarduzzi's best finish at the FIBT World Championships was 11th in the two-woman event at St. Moritz in 2007.

Competing in two Winter Olympics, she earned her best finish of 12th in the two-woman event at Turin in 2006.

External links
 
 

1980 births
Living people
Italian female bobsledders
Bobsledders at the 2006 Winter Olympics
Bobsledders at the 2010 Winter Olympics
Olympic bobsledders of Italy